The 2017–18 División de Honor de Hockey Hierba was the 52nd season of the División de Honor de Hockey Hierba, the highest field hockey league in Spain. The season began on 23 September 2017 and concluded on 3 June 2018.

Atlètic Terrassa were the defending champions. Real Club de Polo won the regular season and their fifteenth national title by defeating Junior 3–1 after shootouts in the final.

Teams

Number of teams by autonomous community

Regular season

League table

Results

Play-offs

Relegation play-off

1st leg

2nd leg

3rd leg

Jolaseta won the decisive third match so they are promoted and SPV Complutense is relegated to the second division.

References

External links
Official page
Flashscore page

División de Honor de Hockey Hierba
Spain
field hockey
field hockey